Mergenthaler is a German surname. Notable people with the surname include:

 Christian Mergenthaler (1884–1980), Nazi German politician and Ministerpräsident of Württemberg
 Ottmar Mergenthaler (1854–1899), German-American inventor of the Linotype machine
 Sara Mergenthaler (born 1979), American sports sailor

See also 
 Mergenthaler Linotype Company, a US corporation founded in 1886 to market the Linotype machine
 Mergenthaler Vocational-Technical High School, a trade school in Baltimore, Maryland
 Morgenthaler (name)
 Morgentaler

German-language surnames